Faxonius menae, the Mena crayfish, is a species of crayfish in the family Cambaridae. It is endemic to the United States. The specific epithet and common name both refer to Mena, Arkansas, where the original specimens were found.

References

External links

Cambaridae
Freshwater crustaceans of North America
Crustaceans described in 1933
Taxobox binomials not recognized by IUCN